Frank Walls (born 1973) is an American illustrator and game designer working primarily in the publishing and table-top gaming industry. He was the Creative Director and cartographer of Empty Room Studios Publishing. He has done illustration work for Talisman, Warhammer, Runebound, and many other board and role-playing games. He has also done a number of book covers for Dark Regions Press, Darkfuse Publishing, and Bad Moon Books.

Works

Books
 The Savage World of Solomon Kane
 Midnight:Hand of Shadow
 Midnight:Honor and Shadow
 Midnight:Destiny and Shadow
 The Ultimate Skill
 Fall of Hades (cover)
 Dweller (cover)
 Gleefully Macabre Tales (cover)
 Wolf Hunt (cover)
 I Will Rise (cover)
 7 Brains (cover)
 Birdbox (cover)
 Beautiful Hell (cover)
 Ursa Major (cover)
 The Samhanach (cover)

Computer games
 Restless
 Badge of Blood
 Nosfuratu
 Battle Bombs

Board games
 StarCraft: The Board Game
 World of Warcraft: The Board Game
 Descent:Altar of Despair
 Descent:Well of Darkness
 Talisman Revised 4th Edition
 Talisman: The Dungeon
 Talisman: The Reaper
 Talisman: The Highlands
 Talisman: The Frostmarch
 Talisman: The City
 Talisman: The Blood Moon
 Runebound: Sands of Al-Kalim
 Runebound: Frozen Wastes

Collectible card games
 A Game of Thrones: Five Kings Edition
 A Game of Thrones: A Time of Ravens
 Call of Cthulhu: Masks of Nyarlathotep
 The Lord of the Rings: The Card Game

External links
 Frank Walls' official website
 Project Zero Games website

References

1973 births
Living people
American illustrators
20th-century American painters
20th-century American male artists
American male painters
21st-century American painters
21st-century American male artists
Fantasy artists
Game artists
Painters from Hawaii
Science fiction artists